Robert Vahey (1932 – 29 October 2013), was a British actor, known for his supporting roles in Samson and Delilah (1959), Z-Cars (1972), Secret Army (1978), Only Fools and Horses (1983 & 1986), Mapp and Lucia (1985), Wycliffe (1996), The League of Extraordinary Gentlemen (2003), and the Ricky Gervais comedy Derek (2013), amongst many others. He is however, probably best remembered for his role as boat builder Bill Sayers, in 75 episodes of the 1980s television series Howards' Way.

He was married to actress Valerie Griffiths from 4 September 1964, until his death.

Robert Vahey died on 29 October 2013, aged 81 years old, in Brighton, East Sussex, England, UK.

References

External links
 

British male soap opera actors
1932 births
2013 deaths